Getting There may refer to:

 Getting There (film), a 2002 film
 Getting There (album), a 1988 album by John Abercrombie